The Unconquered was a 1953 novel by Ben Ames Williams.  It was Williams's final novel, completed in January 1953 less than a month before his death. It is a sequel to House Divided.

References

1953 American novels
Novels published posthumously